Sandra Sofía Ovando Monzón (born 20 July 2003), known as Sofía Ovando, is a Guatemalan footballer who plays as a defender for Deportivo Xela ,Suchitepequez femenil and the Guatemala women's national team.

Club career
Ovando has played for Deportivo Xela in Guatemala.

International career
Ovando made her senior debut for Guatemala on 16 February 2021 in a 3–1 friendly home win over Panama.

References

2003 births
Living people
Guatemalan women's footballers
Women's association football defenders
Guatemala women's international footballers